Karl-Heinz Helbing (born 7 March 1957 in Mainz) is a German former wrestler who competed in the 1976 Summer Olympics and in the 1984 Summer Olympics.

References

External links
 

1933 births
Living people
Olympic wrestlers of West Germany
Wrestlers at the 1976 Summer Olympics
Wrestlers at the 1984 Summer Olympics
German male sport wrestlers
Olympic bronze medalists for West Germany
Olympic medalists in wrestling
Sportspeople from Mainz
People from Rhenish Hesse
Medalists at the 1976 Summer Olympics
20th-century German people
21st-century German people